In mathematics, anticommutativity is a specific property of some non-commutative mathematical operations. Swapping the position of two arguments of an antisymmetric operation yields a result which is the inverse of the result with unswapped arguments. The notion inverse refers to a group structure on the operation's codomain, possibly with another operation. Subtraction is an anticommutative operation because commuting the operands of  gives  for example,  Another prominent example of an anticommutative operation is the Lie bracket.

In mathematical physics, where symmetry is of central importance, these operations are mostly called antisymmetric operations, and are extended in an associative setting to cover more than two arguments.

Definition 
If  are two abelian groups, a bilinear map  is anticommutative if for all  we have

More generally, a multilinear map  is anticommutative if for all  we have

where  is the sign of the permutation .

Properties 
If the abelian group  has no 2-torsion, implying that if  then , then any anticommutative bilinear map  satisfies

More generally, by transposing two elements, any anticommutative multilinear map  satisfies

Conversely, using multilinearity, any alternating map is anticommutative. In the binary case this works as follows: if  is alternating then by bilinearity we have

and the proof in the multilinear case is the same but in only two of the inputs.

Examples 

Examples of anticommutative binary operations include:

 Cross product
 Lie bracket of a Lie algebra
 Lie bracket of a Lie ring
 Subtraction

See also 
 Commutativity
 Commutator
 Exterior algebra
 Graded-commutative ring
 Operation (mathematics)
 Symmetry in mathematics
 Particle statistics (for anticommutativity in physics).

References 
.

External links 

. Which references the Original Russian work
 

Properties of binary operations